The German Doctor is a 2013 Argentine historical drama film directed, produced, and written by Lucía Puenzo, based on her own novel Wakolda (2011). The film stars Àlex Brendemühl as Nazi SS officer and physician Josef Mengele, infamous for performing human experiments in the Auschwitz concentration camp. It also stars Florencia Bado, Natalia Oreiro, Diego Peretti, Elena Roger, and Guillermo Pfening.

Plot
Josef Mengele is in exile in Argentina in 1960, living under a new identity. He makes a long journey by road to a new location by following a family, as the roads are dangerous.  Mengele has his own place to stay in Bariloche, in western Patagonia, but he takes an interest in Lilith, who is the daughter of the family, and he moves into their hotel by paying six months' rent.

Lilith was born prematurely and, as a result, she is much shorter than her classmates.  She is bullied at school because of her size. Mengele is working as a doctor and suggests that he can help her grow more quickly, and Lilith's mother Eva agrees to this.  Both Lilith and her mother conceal this from Lilith's father who has forbidden any such treatments. Meanwhile, people who have been searching for Mengele believe that they have found him and begin to gather evidence on his true identity.

Eva is pregnant with twins, to Mengele's fascination. He compiles copious notes on them, Lilith, and the rest of her family as he continues to aid in her growth. Lilith becomes sick as a side effect of the growth hormones that Mengele has given her. Her father Enzo is furious and demands that Mengele leave the hotel.  Eva goes into labor, and Mengele is the only doctor nearby and is allowed to help with the care of the newborn twins. They are born prematurely, and Mengele starts to experiment on them.  He is conscious of the fact that people are trying to find his true identity, but is hesitant to leave due to his interest in the newborn twins.  Throughout the story Mengele is being tracked by a photographer, Nora Eldoc, who is in contact with Israeli Nazi war criminal hunters.  The Nazi hunters act too slowly on her information allowing Mengele to escape as they watch a sea plane with Mengele on board depart.  The epilogue informs us that she was murdered the day after Mengele's escape, her body found two days later buried in the snow, and that Mengele was never captured and drowned in 1979 in Brazil.

Cast
Àlex Brendemühl as Josef Mengele alias Helmut Gregor
Florencia Bado as Lilith
Diego Peretti as Enzo
Natalia Oreiro as Eva
Elena Roger as Nora Eldoc
Guillermo Pfening as Klaus
Alan Daicz as Tomás
Ana Pauls as Nurse
Abril Braunstein as Ailín
Juani Martínez as Otto

Release
It was screened in the Un Certain Regard section at the 2013 Cannes Film Festival. The film was selected as the Argentine entry for the Best Foreign Language Film at the 86th Academy Awards, but it was not nominated.

Reception
On Rotten Tomatoes, the film has a "Certified Fresh" approval rating of 75% based on reviews from 63 critics, with an average score of 6.5/10. The site's consensus reads, "The German Doctor applies a refreshing level of restraint to its intriguing premise, and boasts solid performances from a talented cast." On Metacritic, it has a score of 62% based on reviews from 18 critics, indicating "generally favorable reviews".

Accolades

See also
List of submissions to the 86th Academy Awards for Best Foreign Language Film
List of Argentine submissions for the Academy Award for Best Foreign Language Film

References

External links

2013 drama films
2013 thriller drama films
Argentine thriller drama films
French thriller drama films
Norwegian thriller drama films
Spanish thriller drama films
Films set in 1960
Films set in Argentina
Films about Nazi hunters
Films about Nazi fugitives in South America
Cultural depictions of Josef Mengele
2010s French films
2010s Argentine films